COL22A1 is a human gene encoding for collagen. The associated protein is thought to contribute to the stabilization of myotendinous junctions and strengthen skeletal muscle attachments during muscle contraction.

References

Collagens